Dalrympelea stipulacea is a species of plant in the family Staphyleaceae. It is a tree endemic to Borneo where it is confined to Sabah.

References

Staphyleaceae
Endemic flora of Borneo
Trees of Borneo
Flora of Sabah
Vulnerable plants
Taxonomy articles created by Polbot